The women's 80 metres hurdles at the 1938 European Athletics Championships was held in Vienna, at the time part of German Reich, at Praterstadion on 17 September 1938.

Medalists

Results

Final
17 September

Heats
17 September

Heat 1

Heat 2

Heat 3

Participation
According to an unofficial count, 9 athletes from 4 countries participated in the event.

 (3)
 (1)
 (2)
 (3)

References

80 metres hurdles
Sprint hurdles at the European Athletics Championships
Euro